Borče Sredojević (born 1 February 1958) is a Serbian football manager and former player.

Playing career

Club
Born in Bosanska Gradiška, SR Bosnia and Herzegovina, to a Bosnian Serb family, he started playing with FK Kozara Gradiška but his playing career highlights were during his spells in the Yugoslav First League with OFK Beograd, FK Borac Banja Luka, NK Rijeka and FK Partizan, before moving to Spain to play in La Liga with Deportivo de La Coruña.

Managerial career
He started his coaching career in 1993 and went to manage several clubs in Bosnia, Serbia and Slovenia. Notably he was assistant-coach of four Bosnia national team coaches, between 2007 and 2014, enjoying full confidence as a tactician and analyst. Notably, Sredojević assisted Fuad Muzurović (2007), Meho Kodro (2008), Miroslav Blažević (2008-2009) and Safet Sušić (2010-2014). The greatest success for Sredojević came in 2014, when he reached historical first FIFA World Cup 2014 with his Bosnia and Herzegovina national football team while assisting to Safet Sušić who served as team's manager. Meanwhile, he also led Premier League of Bosnia and Herzegovina club FK Leotar as the head coach.

He was appointed manager of Borac Banja Luka in March 2016 but could not save the club from relegation and his last job was as a manager of FK Kozara Gradiška in the First League of the Republika Srpska, which ended on 26 September 2017.

References

External links
Stats from Yugoslav leagues at Zerodic

1958 births
Living people
People from Gradiška, Bosnia and Herzegovina
Serbs of Bosnia and Herzegovina
Association football defenders
Yugoslav footballers
FK Kozara Gradiška players
FK Borac Banja Luka players
HNK Rijeka players
FK Partizan players
Deportivo de La Coruña players
Yugoslav First League players
Segunda División players
Yugoslav expatriate footballers
Expatriate footballers in Spain
Yugoslav expatriate sportspeople in Spain
Bosnia and Herzegovina football managers
FK Kozara Gradiška managers
FK Mladost Apatin managers
NK Domžale managers
NK Primorje managers
FK Borac Banja Luka managers
FK Leotar managers
Premier League of Bosnia and Herzegovina managers
Bosnia and Herzegovina expatriate football managers
Expatriate football managers in Serbia and Montenegro
Bosnia and Herzegovina expatriate sportspeople in Serbia and Montenegro
Expatriate football managers in Slovenia
Bosnia and Herzegovina expatriate sportspeople in Slovenia